The Berlin Wintergarten theatre was a large variety theatre in Berlin-Mitte.

It opened in 1887 and was destroyed by bombs during the Second World War.

The Skladanowsky brothers showcased the first short film presentation at the theatre in 1895, making it the first Bioscop movie theater in history. Beyond a movie theatre, it was a multi-use variety theatre. As art historian Erwin Panofsky recalls, in about 1905 "there was only one obscure and faintly disreputable kino in the whole city of Berlin, bearing, for some unfathomable reason, the English name of 'The Meeting Room'."

The theatre was restarted, relocated and the title licensed in 1992.  The new location is on Potsdamer Straße just South of Potsdamer Platz in Berlin.

References

External links

Former theatres in Germany
Theatres in Berlin
Theatres completed in 1887
Former cinemas